Genduara is a genus of moths in the family Lasiocampidae. The genus was erected by Francis Walker in 1856. All species in the genus are from Australia.

Species
Based on Lepidoptera and Some Other Life Forms:
Genduara fola (Swinhoe, 1902)
Genduara punctigera (Walker, 1855)
Genduara macqueeni (Turner, 1936)
Genduara acedesta (Turner, 1911)
Genduara contermina (Walker, 1865)
Genduara subnotata (Walker, 1869)
Genduara albicans (Swinhoe, 1892)
Genduara pinnalis (Lucas, 1895)
Genduara rhoda (Swinhoe, 1902)
Genduara macroptila (Turner, 1911)
Genduara dianipha (Turner, 1911)

References

Lasiocampidae